Brian Gilbert and Kitty McKane were the defending champions, but lost in the quarterfinals to eventual champions Jean Borotra and Suzanne Lenglen.

Borotra and Lenglen defeated Uberto de Morpurgo and Elizabeth Ryan in the final, 6–3, 6–3 to win the mixed doubles tennis title at the 1925 Wimbledon Championships.

Draw

Finals

Top half

Section 1

The nationalities of Mrs K Buchanan and Mrs Heathcote are unknown.

Section 2

Bottom half

Section 3

Section 4

References

External links

X=Mixed Doubles
Wimbledon Championship by year – Mixed doubles